The  is an automobile which has been produced by Toyota in Japan since 1955. It is primarily a line of mid-size luxury cars that is marketed as an upmarket offering in the Toyota lineup.

Introduced in 1955 as the Toyopet Crown, it has served as the mainstream sedan from Toyota in the Japanese market throughout its existence and holds the distinction of being the longest-running passenger-car nameplate affixed to any Toyota model, along with being the first Toyota vehicle to be exported to the United States in 1958. Its traditional competitors in Japan and Asia have been the Nissan Cedric/Gloria/Fuga and the Honda Legend, along with the defunct Mazda Luce, Isuzu Bellel and Mitsubishi Debonair.

Formerly only available at Toyota Store dealers in Japan, the Crown has been popular for government usage, whether as a police car or for transporting government officials. It has also been popular with Japanese companies as company cars along with use as a taxicab. While a base Crown was available for many years aimed at the taxicab market, the increasing opulence and price of the Crown line led to the creation of the Comfort in 1995 as a more affordable alternative.  Outside Japan, the larger Lexus LS took over the role of Toyota's flagship sedan in 1989 in the company's global lineup.

In North America, the first through fourth generations were offered from 1958 through 1972, being replaced by the Corona Mark II.  The Crown nameplate returned to the North American market in 2022, when the sixteenth-generation model was released. The Crown has also been partially succeeded in export markets by its closely related sibling, the Lexus GS, which since its debut in 1991 as the Toyota Aristo has always shared the Crown's platform and powertrain options. Later models of the GS and Crown have taken on a very strong aesthetic kinship through shared design cues.

In 2022, Toyota unveiled four different Crown models to replace the fifteenth-generation model. The first model that is available is the Crossover-type Crown, which is also marketed in North America as the sole Crown model. The remaining three models: Sedan, Sport, and Estate, will be released later.

The Crown's history and reputation has given it prominence in the Toyota lineup, as it is one of the few current Toyota models to carry its own unique insignia for the model line with the current Crown having a stylized crown emblem on the grille and steering wheel along with inspiring the names of its smaller progenitors. The Corona, introduced as a smaller companion to the Crown means "crown" in Latin and was initially exported as the "Tiara", while the Corolla took its name from the corolla ("small crown") in Latin. The Camry's name is derived from the Japanese phrase  meaning "little crown" and the Scepter took its name from the sceptre, an accessory to a crown. The Avalon (the Crown's North American counterpart), while not named after a crown, is named after a mythical island from the legends of King Arthur.

Toyota's "Discover Crown Spirit Project" is a program in which Japanese Toyota dealers fully restore instances of every generation of the Crown to show that even the oldest Crown still works.

Exports 

The Crown was first exported to the United States from 1958 to 1972 as the first model Toyota exported to the country. In 1960, Toyota temporarily suspended exports to the region as the Crown was not capable of speeds needed on American freeways, before introducing an improved model. The Crown was also exported to Canada from 1964 to 1972, and Mexico from 1959 to 1964.

Exports to Europe began in 1964 with the first cars going to Finland. Other European countries which saw early imports of the Crown included the Netherlands and Belgium. The United Kingdom was another European market until the early 1980s. Australia was another important export market for the Crown – to the extent that it was manufactured there from the mid-1960s until the late 1980s using many local components. It was discontinued when the button car plan was put into effect. 

The island nations of Aruba and Curaçao in the Southern Caribbean also imported the Crown starting from the second generation (S40) in 1965 in Curaçao up until importation of the tenth generation (S150). It was discontinued in 1998 due to the high price and low demand combined with the introduction of the Lexus GS series.

In 2019, a small number of fifteenth-generation Crowns were exported to Indonesia for use as an official vehicle by cabinet ministers and other government officials.

The sixteenth-generation Crown that was introduced in 2022 will be exported to about 40 countries with an expected annual sales volume of around 200,000 units.

Toyopet Crown – First generation (RS/S10/S20/S30; 1955) 

The Crown was introduced in 1955 in Japan to meet the demands of public transportation. The Crown was intended for private purchase, while the Master served in a commercial form as a taxi, both with the same 1.5 L Type R engine used on their previous car, the Toyopet Super. The front doors open conventionally, and the rear doors are "suicide doors", a feature also utilized on the Toyota AA, Toyota's first car. Small engine displacements were used to keep the vehicle affordable, as the Japanese government began to impose an annual road tax to help develop and maintain a national transportation infrastructure in 1950. The appearance of the Crown shows some similarities with the European Ford Versailles and Simca Vedette. The Toyota Patrol was a police car version of the 1955 Crown.

The Crown was much more popular than the Master due to the more compliant suspension of the Crown, and while the Master was intended for taxi service, the Crown was more accepted by the market over the Master, and more Crowns were sold into taxi service than the Master. The Crown was designed to replace the Super but Toyota was not sure if its independent front coil suspension and its suicide type rear doors were too radical for the taxi market to bear. So the Super was updated, renamed the Master and sold in tandem to the Crown, at Toyota Store locations. When sales of the Crown proved worthwhile, the Master was discontinued in November 1956 after being in production for only one year, and production facilities for the Master were transferred to the Crown. While the Master was discontinued the commercial vehicle based thereon, the Masterline, continued to be offered (utilities, wagons and vans) until 1959. A six-door wagon known as the Airport Limousine was shown as a concept car at the 1961 Tokyo Motor Show. It did not go into production.

In December 1955, the Crown Deluxe (RSD) was introduced, a posher model equipped with a radio and heater as standard. The initial RS model received a cosmetic update in 1958 to become the RS20, now with hooded headlights and a single-piece front windshield. In October 1959, Japan's first diesel-engine passenger car, the Crown Diesel, was introduced. Its C-series engine only had . In October 1960, the 1.5 L R engine was complemented by the larger 1.9 L (1,896 cc) 3R engine for a model called the RS30, originally only available in the Deluxe version. The 1900 was also available with the new two-speed Toyoglide automatic transmission. In April 1961, a Crown Standard 1900 was added.

Its coil and double wishbone independent front suspension was a departure from the leaf sprung beam axle front suspension used on most previous models but was similar to the independent front suspension used on the 1947 Toyopet SA. The live axle rear suspension was similar to that used on most of the previous models (unlike the trailing arm rear suspension used on the SA). Taxi versions were produced and beginning in March 1959 commercial versions of the vehicle were also available, as an estate wagon and a three- or six-seat coupe utility. These took over the "Toyopet Masterline" name in the Japanese domestic market, but usually received "Crown" badges in the export. The "Crown" name was previously in use by the Imperial limousine manufactured by Chrysler in the early 1950s.

In 1958, it introduced a ball joint suspension. Production of the double-cab Masterline pickup (RR19) started in April 1957 by the former Central Motors.

In August 1957, three Toyota delegates with the intent to establish a sales company in the United States introduced a white and black Crown and Crown Deluxe at a public relations event attended by dealers and the media. Both models were constructed with 50% thicker steel than the average American car at the time and the black Deluxe model was nicely appointed with lots of chrome and luxurious items like a radio, heater and whitewall tires which prompted the press to liken it to a "baby Cadillac". This promising initial showing along with the strong reputation of the Crown in Japan gave Toyota the confidence to pursue exports to the United States despite known high-speed performance issues. As a publicity stunt to demonstrate the car's reliability, Toyota staged a campaign common to American automakers: a coast-to-coast endurance run from Los Angeles to New York. The Toyopet was barely able to limp into Las Vegas before the project had to be called off.

Toyota's first export to the United States began with 30 Crown Deluxes in June 1958 after establishing Toyota Motor Sales USA the previous October, the first directly managed retail dealer (Hollywood Toyota) the previous February, U.S. wholesale and import companies, and a parts warehouse in Long Beach. Toyota also signs up 45 dealers to sell cars in its initial year, growing to 70 dealers by 1960 and 90 by 1962. In the effort to obtain certification from the California Highway Patrol for the sale of the Crown in California, Toyota shipped the cars without headlights and installed General Electric sourced sealed beam units upon arrival which met the required standard for brightness.

Since the car was designed for the muddy, slow, unpaved Japanese roads, it failed the mass urban landscape of the US because of its inability to keep up with traffic on the faster interstate highways, along with stability, noise and vibration concerns. The car was also very rigid and heavy for its size at 2700 pounds. Motor Trend reported "The Toyopet is so rigid that jacking up one wheel at the rear bumper quickly lifted the other rear wheel". They also observed an average of 23.5 mpg combined city/highway for 407 miles. To remedy the performance issues along with the resulting breakage of parts from being overly stressed, Toyota introduced the newer RS22L and the RS32L series Crown with the larger 3R engine and other improvements for high-speed driving in July 1960.

Options included $94 AM radio and $75 whitewall tires. By comparison, an optioned up Crown was $32 more than the base Chevy Del Ray and $10 more than the Rambler Rebel V8 sedan. Total sales for the initial year were 287. For 1959, sales were again limited to only sedan models and despite a price boost to $2,329 for the Deluxe model, sales more than tripled to 967 units. For 1960, Toyota added a wagon body style ($2,111 for the two-door, $2,211 for the four-door) but in the midst of Detroit's Big Three compact cars (Ford Falcon, Chevy Corvair and Plymouth Valiant), sales fell to 659 units. For 1961, the Crown was being sold with the newer 3R engine and alongside the new smaller Tiara model with the Crown's outgoing 1.5L engine. Only the Custom sedan and wagon were offered ($1,795 and $2,080 respectively). Total sales for 1961 reached only 225 units, trailing off to 74 for 1962, and finally 28 for 1963. Total sales for the Toyopet Crown RS series in the United States is 2,240.

By the end of 1960, Toyota Motor Sales USA had accumulated 1.42 million dollars in losses from lackluster sales of the Crown. To prevent any further loss, all passenger car imports were suspended and new management structures were established to refocus all sales efforts on the Toyota Land Cruiser with profitability expected from selling 50 to 60 per month until the development of a new car suitable for the US market.

In November 2000, Toyota released the Origin, a retro version of the RS series Crown to celebrate 100 million vehicles having been built in Japan.

Gallery

Toyopet Crown – Second generation (S40; 1962) 

Due to the introduction of the Corona, the dramatically restyled and enlarged Series S40 was launched in 1962, and saw the introduction of the Custom model. According to the Japanese Wikipedia article for the Crown, the styling was said to be influenced by the recently introduced Ford Falcon in 1960. The front grille approach has a similar appearance to the 1960 Imperial Crown (Chrysler), which speaks to Toyota's aspirations that the Crown be a large, comfortable sedan. The station wagon body style carried over from the previous generation Masterline, but with more attention to the luxurious approach used on the Crown.

Headlights were integrated within the boundaries of the greatly enlarged grille, providing a clean, modern appearance. A 2-speed automatic transmission was introduced, called Toyoglide, with a column shift. A bigger and better car than the previous S30 series, it initially had four-cylinder R-series engines before the addition of the "M" six-cylinder engine in 1965. Deluxe and Super Deluxe models were available with added features. The ladder frame chassis of the previous generation was replaced with an X-frame to achieve a lower centre of gravity. The sedan and wagon were known simply as the Crown while the commercial vehicles (coupe utility, double cab coupe utility (pick ups), and van) were known as the Masterline. There was also a limited run of the sedan known as the Toyota Crown S (MS41S) which featured twin SU style carburettors on the 2.0L M in-line-six engine, sportier camshaft, sports instrumentation, sports suspension, four-speed floor shift, bucket seats, 14 inch wheels, disc brakes on the front and larger drum brakes in the rear.

This Crown became the first Toyota to be exported to Europe, after the head of Denmark's Erla Auto Import A/S saw it at the Tokyo Motor Show. They brought in 190 of these subsequent to a May 1963 agreement. In Canada, it was introduced in November 1964 as one of the first Toyota models available in the country alongside the UP10 Publica. In the US, the MS41L sedan was available in the US for  PoE while the MS46LG station wagon was available for  PoE.

A two-door Crown Convertible was displayed at the 1963 Tokyo Motor Show, based on the Crown 1900 sedan. It was not put into production.

This Crown generation was the first to be assembled in Australia, from CKD kits, by AMI in Port Melbourne, with significant local content. AMI, which assembled numerous brands including Triumph and, for a short time, Mercedes-Benz, was to become the basis of Toyota's current Australian manufacturing operation.

Crown Eight (G10) 

The longer, wider and more upmarket Crown Eight was introduced in 1964 for the Japanese market, powered by a 2.6 L V8 engine. However, it had a different model designation, G10 (VG10 when fitted by 2.6 L V engine). The car was first introduced at the 1963 Tokyo Motor Show and introduced for sale on April 20, 1964, nine days before Emperor Showa's birthday and the beginning of Golden Week in Japan.

The Crown Eight was developed and assembled by Toyota's subcontracting company Kanto Auto Works. Toyota delegated the production because the Crown Eight had many different components compared to the Crown, which could have hindered mass-production operations at the Motomachi plant as the Crown Eight's production volume was approximately 1,000 cars per year.

The Crown Eight was designed primarily to replace full-sized American automobiles that were commonly used by major corporations. The Crown Eight represents the first Japanese mass-produced vehicle with an 8-cylinder engine. The main rivals at the time were the Prince Gloria Super, Mitsubishi Debonair, and Nissan Cedric Special, all equipped with a six-cylinder engine. It was the first Crown to exceed vehicle size classification regulations in length, width and engine displacement capacity.

The Crown Eight was considered as a possible submission for use by the Japanese Imperial Household Agency as a car to be used by senior members of the Imperial House of Japan, but it lost out to the Nissan Prince Royal. The Crown Eight was replaced in 1967 by the first Century with the model code VG20. Approx 3,800 Crown Eights were produced. Some of the items that were exclusive to the Crown Eight were climate control, automatic headlamps, electrically powered windows, electric cruise control, a three-speed "Toyoglide" automatic transmission, and electromagnetic door latches, which were also installed on the Crown Eight successor, the Century.

Toyopet Crown – Third generation (S50; 1967) 

Launched in 1967, the mechanicals were much the same as the previous generation, but additional equipment was included. The X-frame chassis of the S40 series was now dropped in favour of a perimeter frame that improved collision protection for passengers; this chassis design would remain in use until 1999 when the S130-series wagons were superseded by the unibody S170-series Estates. Higher specification models used the 2.0-liter M engine or the 2.3-liter 2M engine shared with the Toyota 2000GT sports coupe. A premium level Super Saloon joined the Super Deluxe model, and was available with the 2M engine including twin carburettors, electric windows, rear seat radio controls, air conditioning and luxury fabric on the seating including the Crown logo embossed into the vinyl. Lower specified models were equipped with the R-series four-cylinder engines. Crown vehicles meant for commercial use had received the Masterline nameplate until the introduction of this generation; they were now badged "Crown" as well. However, this generation was the last to be offered in an entire line of commercials - from the next generation on, the only commercial-use model available was the Crown Van, whose bodywork was also used for the Wagon models. Crown Double-Cab pickups were produced by the former Central Motor Co., Ltd. until December 1970.

When the 1967 S50 series Crown was introduced to Japan, television commercials used Japanese actor Satoshi Yamamura, who among his many roles on stage, movie, and television, portrayed Fleet Admiral Isoroku Yamamoto in the 1970s movie Tora! Tora! Tora! Yamamura would serve as the Crown spokesman for 16 years, introducing subsequent new generations of Crown products until 1983.

The Crown range now included the four-door station wagon, pick-up (rare), double cab pick-up (very rare) and the new two-door hardtop "personal luxury car". In September 1968 the option of power steering was added. In 1969 the Crown received a facelift for the headlight, grill and trim arrangement. The Crown S used the two-liter 'six', but due to sportier tuning it produced more power than the larger 2M,  at 5,800 rpm versus  at 5,200 rpm. This generation was the only one to use a double-hinged tailgate, as the next generation converted to an overhead-lifting hatchback door.

Crowns that were equipped with the 2,253 cc 2M engine were no longer classified as compact cars under Japanese vehicle size classification regulations, even though the length and width were still in compliance. Toyota offered the larger engine so that buyers who were traditionally served by the Crown could now choose the all-new Corona Mark II in 1968. This allowed Toyota to reposition the Crown as the top level privately available luxury sedan, with much nicer interior treatments, more spacious accommodations. This was the last generation for the pick-up versions of the Crown, as load carrying was ceded to the new Toyota Hilux in February 1971.

Australian market models were assembled in Australia by Australian Motor Industries. The two-door ute was also assembled in Australia, but not the coupé model. This generation was imported fully assembled into New Zealand from 1968 to 1971.

This generation was still sold in the United States; 1970 was the most successful year for the nameplate in the US with 6,528 being sold.

Notable features on the Crown Wagon were:
 7- or 8-passenger seating (two on front buckets or three on a bench seat, three on a rear bench seat, and two on a fold up cargo seat),
 a powered rear window,
 a side-swing tailgate.

Fourth generation (S60/S70; 1971) 

Launched in February 1971, the 4M 2600 engine was introduced with this generation, as was the luxurious Super Saloon trim level, followed by the Super Deluxe and Deluxe. The top-of-the-line Royal Saloon was first introduced in the facelifted Crown from 1973, adding luxury features from the Century limousine. The 2.0-liter 5R inline-four engine and the 2.0-liter M six-cylinder engine were also available. In some markets the previous 2.3-liter "2M" six remained available, in sedan or "utility wagon" forms. The Utility Wagon was a version halfway between commercial and passenger car, and had chassis codes MS67V until the early 1973 facelift when it was replaced by the MS68V with the 2.6 engine.

Previous generations of the Crown had been marketed under the Toyopet name but the fourth-generation model was the first version to be officially known worldwide as the Toyota Crown.

The Sedan and Wagon (Custom) are coded RS60/MS60/MS64/MS65 and MS62/MS63, while the Van was coded MS66V with the two liter "six". The Hardtop Coupé is MS70 (2.0-liter), or MS75 (2.6-liter). The Japanese market Crown Custom (Wagon) was classified as a seven-seater. This generation was the first Crown marketed as a Toyota in Japan, as previous models were marketed as Toyopets. Also, in Japan, this model was known as the "whale" or "kujira" Crown.

In 1973, Japanese television commercials introduced Japanese actress Sayuri Yoshinaga as a co-spokeswoman, joining Satoshi Yamamura, and together they appeared in commercials until 1983.

While the domestic market Hardtop has rectangular halogen headlights, all export models come with twin round headlights. This model achieved few sales in the US due to its high price when compared to competing domestic models, and possibly its styling with flush bumpers, called "spindle-shaped" in period marketing. Only the first two years were imported to North America, where it was the last Crown to be sold until 2022. The Corona Mark II replaced the Crown in North America.

The trunk could be opened remotely by turning the ignition key to the far left, and a button on the floor caused the radio to engage the signal seeking feature. A separate signal seeking feature was installed for rear seat passengers, installed behind the front seat facing the rear seat compartment. The 60-series Crown underwent a facelift in January 1973.

Australian models were assembled in Australia by AMI. It was available in New Zealand fully imported from 1971 to 1973, with local assembly beginning at Steels Motor Assemblies, who also built the Corona, not long before the mid-life facelift, improving availability. Steels subsequently became Toyota NZ's Christchurch CKD assembly plant.

Fifth generation (S80/S90/S100; 1974) 

Launched in 1974 in Japan, export began from 1975. It was offered as four-door sedan, two-door hardtop coupe, four-door hardtop sedan, wagon, and van. Engines are 2.0- and 2.6-liter gasoline. The 2.2-liter diesel was introduced in October 1977. Trim levels are Standard, Deluxe, Super Saloon, and Royal Saloon.

The Royal Saloon came in a longer body length, coupled with the 2.6L engine while lower trim levels were in the shorter body style and 2.0 L engines. Export models used the same body whether the two-liter 5R four-cylinder or the 2.6-liter 4M inline-six. In Europe, these models claimed  respectively.

Minor change was given in 1978. This version of the Crown saw the introduction of disc brakes at both the front and rear axles with anti-lock brakes, speed sensitive power steering, and a 4-speed automatic transmission with overdrive. Originally, sedans and wagons had S80-series chassis numbers, while the two- and four-door hardtops received the S90-series chassis numbers. After 1976 and concurrent with the introduction of new stricter emissions regulations, all Japanese market Crowns used S100-series chassis numbers. Export models continued to use the previous codes.

Initially available with the "old style" 4M engine with rounded valve cover, later models switched to the new 4M engine with rectangular valve cover. This generation also saw the introduction of fuel injection on both the 2.6-liter 4M and the 2.0-liter M engines, coupled with Toyota's TTC-C technology, adding a catalytic converter to the exhaust system. The emissions controlling technology badge helped identify which vehicles had reduced emissions tax liability. Select models also were available with four-wheel disc brakes and twin piston calipers on the front brakes. The models installed with the diesel engine was exclusive to Toyota Diesel Store locations.

The Hardtop Sedan model has a front chrome grill and square headlights, but was no longer considered a true hardtop, due to the inclusion of a "B" pillar. The styling differences between the hardtop and sedan four-door models was that the side windows on the hardtop were frameless, and the rear window was sloped more than the formal appearing sedan. This series Crown in the Royal Saloon trim package exceeded length regulations of 4.7 m set forth by Japanese regulations by 65 mm, but Toyota continued to offer a 2.0 L engine in a shorter vehicle for buyers who were looking for better fuel economy over the larger six-cylinder engines, and reduced road tax liability.

New Zealand models were assembled in New Zealand but on an SKD basis - which meant it had more Japanese content (such as glass) than earlier CKD versions. It was the last Crown built in New Zealand and was replaced in 1979 by the Cressida (Mark II), which was available with a four-cylinder engine. The oil crises of 1973/4 and 1979/80 had led the government to impose a 60 percent sales tax on larger engines, and the Crown could no longer be priced to suit its market. This generation Crown was imported fully built-up to Australia, and only available with the largest 2.6-liter six-cylinder engine. It was never a strong seller in Australia, offering less performance and roadholding than the domestic competitors from Ford and Holden.

Sixth generation (S110; 1979) 

Launched in 1979, this model had the engine upgraded from the 2.6 L to 2.8 L 5M-EU model.  The 2-liter M was still on offer along with a turbocharged version – the M-TEU. The carburated 5M engine was also available in certain markets. In this series the model designation referred to the engine size – MS110 (2-liter), MS111 (2.6-liter), MS112 (2.8-liter). This was the last generation to install a four-cylinder, gasoline-powered engine. This model was the first generation Crown to be sold in Germany, beginning in 1980. The fuel injected 2.8 developed  in European trim, while the 2.2 diesel offered  and a choice of five-speed manual or an automatic (not in the Station Wagon). European sales started out at a respectable level, but with prices increasing at an alarming rate due to the appreciation of the yen, sales had dropped drastically by 1982.

Early models have twin rectangular headlights, while facelift models come with bigger monoblock headlights. Domestic market Royal Saloons use the large rectangular headlights. Lower grades Van and Taxi models adopted round headlights. Royal Saloon features longer bumpers and bigger engines, which were placed in a larger road tax classification according to Japanese government dimension regulations. The first Crown Turbo was launched in October 1980 for Japanese market only. Offering the 2.0 L engines was for buyers who didn't want to pay the large car tax, while offering better fuel economy than the larger engines. The turbo also provided a benefit in increasing fuel efficiency while reducing tailpipe emissions as Japanese consumers pay a tax on the amount of regulated substances being sent into the atmosphere from a Japanese law passed in the 1970s.

In some export markets, such as Southeast Asia, the larger six-cylinder engines came fitted with carburettors. In those specs, the 2.6 offered  SAE net while the 2.8 claimed  DIN or 120 SAE net. Sales in Indonesia were low and this generation was not replaced there in 1984, when the 120-series Crown appeared.

This generation is the last for the two-door hardtop coupé bodystyle, which was replaced by the Soarer. Reflecting a popular styling appearance during the 1970s, the coupé was fitted with a padded vinyl roof and "opera windows" for a luxurious appearance. Some of the options that became available were an Electronic compass, glass moon roof, power drivers seat, cruise control, electronic stereo tuner, and two-tone paint. Automatic climate control also appeared on this vehicle with separate controls installed for rear seat passengers as well as a rear-mounted mini fridge cooled by the separate rear seat air conditioning unit. The 2.4-liter turbo-diesel appeared in August 1982.

Seventh generation (S120; 1983) 

Launched in 1983, this model used all three versions of the 5M 2.8L engine: the carburetted 5M version, the single overhead cam (SOHC) multi-point fuel-injected 5M-E version, and the double overhead cam (DOHC) 5M-GE. Other engines included the 1G-GE 2.0L DOHC, M-TE 2.0L single overhead cam (SOHC) Turbo, M-E 2.0L SOHC, 2L-TE 2.4L SOHC Turbo Diesel Ceramics Power or 2.4L SOHC Diesel Ceramics Power engines. All 2.0 L engines were installed with T-VIS (Toyota Variable Induction System). In September 1985, a supercharged version of the 2-liter G-series six replaced the turbocharged M-series.

Base versions use the new 2-liter 1G-E engine which replaced the old 2-liter version of the M series. The Japanese market "van" version of the station wagon (the GS126V as well as the GS136V in the following series) used its own unique variant of this motor which took advantage of laxer emissions standards for commercial vehicles (the 1G-EJ). In Japan, taxi and commercial versions were also available with an LPG-powered four-cylinder engine (the 3Y) which was even offered with a three-speed, column-shifted manual. A gasoline-fueled version of this engine was available in some European and "general" export markets.

The lower-grade models were available with Toyota's F292 live axle rear suspension while the rest introduced 4-wheel independent suspension branded as PEGASUS (Precision Engineered Geometrically Advanced Suspension) on the Crown for the first time, with TEMS installed on the Royal Saloon sedan and hardtops, coupled with Toyota's ECT electronically controlled four-speed automatic transmission, and 4ESC anti-lock brakes.

The S120 was available in Hardtop sedan (frameless door glass), sedan and wagon versions but in two different exterior dimensions for length and width, with the Royal Saloon hardtop and sedan only offered in the larger body.

The top-trim package was called the Royal Saloon, followed by Super Saloon Extra, Super Select for hardtop bodystyles, followed by the Royal Saloon sedan, Super Saloon Extra sedan, and the wagon came only as Super Saloon Extra.

The Super Saloon Extra and Royal Saloon versions were packed with features such as dual-zone climate control, AM/FM cassette stereo with six acoustically matched speakers, combined with a separate rear cassette stereo with headphones, with dashboard-installed integrated CD player, and separate A/C and stereo control buttons installed in the rear armrest, parcel shelf mounted refrigerator, automatic headlights, reading lamps for all outboard seating positions, electrically adjusted tilt and telescoping steering column combined with a steering wheel and seat memory feature, glovebox mounted courtesy mirror among many things, while the slightly lower trim package Super Select was more modestly equipped.

One distinctive styling feature of this generation was the use of a clear panel with patterned backing for the C-pillar trim on the sedans. For the Japanese market only, Toyota made the  Twincam 12-valve 3.0-liter 6M-GE available on the Royal Saloon for the mid-cycle update. This engine is a popular swap for 5M-GE powered Supras and Cressidas of the same period.

This was the last generation Crown to be commonly available in European markets. The fuel injected 2.8-liter engine in European trim produces  at 5600 rpm and had identical specifications to the Supra sold there at the time. Swiss buyers, however, had to make do with the single-cam  5M-E engine due to their particular emissions restrictions.

For general export markets such as Southeast Asia and the GCC countries, the carburetted 5M engine was also available. This version produces  at 5000 rpm and was even available with a four-speed manual transmission.

Eighth generation (S130; 1987) 

Launched in 1987, it came in sedan, hardtop, and wagon body styles, including a van model for commercial uses. This model used the 7M-GE 3000 cc DOHC, 1G-GZE 2000 cc DOHC supercharger, 1G-GE 2000 cc DOHC, 1G-E 2000 cc, 2L-THE 2400 cc SOHC Turbo Diesel Hi-Power (automatics), 2L-TE 2400 cc SOHC Turbo Diesel (with manual transmission) or 2L 2400 cc SOHC naturally aspirated diesel engine. The 4.0-liter 1UZ-FE, the same engine as in Lexus LS400, later became available in the Royal Saloon G, which became the Toyota Crown Majesta with the next generation Crown. The air suspension-equipped Royal Saloon G was also available with the 3-liter inline-six engines. Due to the different suspension, the Royal Saloon G carries a different model code (MS137 versus MS135 for the coil-sprung models). The better-equipped models receive an independent semi-trailing arm rear suspension, while the simpler versions (including all wagons and vans) have live rear axles located by trailing links. These versions receive different chassis numbers (GS130 versus GS131, for instance).

In 1988, it became the first Toyota available with an airbag.

Although a totally different chassis and body, the S130 shares styling cues with the X80 Cressida. In 1989, the top-level Royal Saloon G introduced the world's first CD-ROM-based automotive navigation system, with color CRT display. Also, TRC traction control and electronically controlled shock absorbers called TEMS (shared with the first generation Toyota Soarer) were adopted. This Crown was sold only in Japan, the Middle East, the Caribbean, and select Asian markets. Some export markets received the older 2.8 liter SOHC inline-six, either carburetted or fuel injected. For general countries, only with left-hand drive and a four-speed manual transmission, the 2.2-liter inline-four 4Y engine was also available.

In September 1988, a narrow-angle twin-cam version of the two-liter inline-six engine (the 1G-FE) replaced the two-valve 1G-E in most applications, although the lower cost model continued to be available in commercial models until September 1989. In August 1989, the Crown received a light facelift, with more aerodynamic design front and rear, incorporating new bumpers. This was also when the 4-liter V8-engined Royal Saloon G was introduced, using the same engine which was to appear in the Lexus LS400 within a month. The LPG-powered M engine was replaced with the more powerful 1G-GP version at the same time, while the four-cylinder 3Y engine received fuel injection.

In August 1990, a version of the supercharged 2.0 model fitted with the bigger body of the 3.0 was added to the lineup (GS131H). This car was placed in a much higher tax bracket than the narrower-bodied versions. Such cars have different license plates than more compact cars and are therefore considered prestigious, if expensive. This was also when the new 2.5-liter 1JZ-GE engine was introduced as the 2500 Royal Saloon, available as a Sedan, Hardtop, or Wagon, replacing the earlier 2-liter Royal Saloon model. A few LPG-powered models were also available for commercial uses, using two-liter engines with either four or six cylinders. In October 1991, a large-bodied variant of the turbodiesel sedan was presented.

Station wagons were considered separate from the commercial van models in Japan. They were originally equipped with the 2-liter 1G-FE six, or as a supercharged "Royal Saloon" wagon. The 2.4 turbodiesel was also available. As of August 1990, the 2.5-liter 1JZ-FE was also made available in the station wagon lineup.

Facelift (1991–1999) 
In August 1991, when the Crown hardtop was redesigned and became the S140 series, the Crown sedan and wagon and van were also restyled but retained the S130 model code. At this point the 1JZ-GE and 2JZ-GE engines replaced the M-series in-line-six engines for the Crown lineup, as well as some of the supercharged G-series models. The Standard Sedan for Taxi and base model Wagon feature round headlights and chrome bumpers. The taxi is powered by 2.4-liter diesel engine matched to 4-speed column-mounted manual transmission. In Hong Kong and Singapore, the Crown Sedan with the diesel engine was the most common vehicle used as taxis.

The Crown Royal Saloon, meanwhile, was an exclusive car. In October 1991, the supercharged model was discontinued. In December 1995, the sales of sedan model was stopped for the Japanese market. The sales of the wagon and van were stopped in December 1999.

In 1993, Great Wall made unlicensed clones of the S130 under the name CC1020S. Great Wall also made a station wagon variant, known as CC6470, and a crew cab version which was known as CC1020S. A version with stretched station wagon bodywork set on the BJ212 "Jeep" chassis was also offered.

Indonesian assembly (1989–2000) 
This generation marked the return of the Crown to Indonesia in 1989, where it had not been sold regularly since 1984 when it was replaced by GX71 Cressida. This car was assembled locally by Toyota Astra Motor. It was originally sold with the two-liter 1G-FE inline-six engine (GS131). Two trim levels were available, 2.0i Super Saloon with 5-speed manual transmission and 2.0i Royal Saloon with 4-speed automatic transmission. It received major facelift in 1992 and continued to be built after 1995 when the sedan was replaced in Japan. Also in 1995, The 2.0 was replaced with a 2JZ-GE 3-liter engine. Unique for Indonesia, the Crown 3.0 Super Saloon trim was combined with a 5-speed manual transmission, while the more expensive 3.0 Royal Saloon was available with a 4-speed automatic transmission. The production of S130 Crown in Indonesia was stopped in 2000.

Saibeijian Crown 
While the S130 Crown was officially sold by Toyota in China, there was also a rebadged S130 Crown sold as  Saibeijian Crown by Datong Saibeijian Auto Works at the same time. This brand also rebadged numerous cars such as Toyota Previa, Honda Accord, Nissan Sunny and Honda Odyssey.

In the early 1980s, the number of imported cars in China increased dramatically, despite the high import tax. China's consumer spending was getting out of control and created a severe trade deficit. Customs duties on imported goods were raised in March 1985 and a new "regulatory tax" was added a few months later. By the fall of 1985, a two-year moratorium on nearly all vehicle imports was imposed. While limiting imports, China also tried to increase local production by boosting the various existing joint-venture passenger car production agreements, as well as adding new ones. But the unclear definition of "car production in China" at that time, inspired the local entrepreneurs to use this loophole.

These rebadged cars were actually fully imported cars from Japan and then were shipped to Hong Kong but without tires, mirrors, and door handles to be classified as "car parts", thus avoiding 60-80% import tax. The remaining parts were also shipped from Japan to Hong Kong and was assembled as a full car at Guangdong. But to be able to sell these cars, this Guangdong-based company need a government approved local automobile brand. The company then made a business deal with Shanxi-based small bus manufacturer, Datong Saibeijian Auto Works, to use their licensed brand for selling these cars and one of them was the Saibeijian Crown.

This was barely concealed smuggling. This made both the real joint ventures that invested so much money and the Chinese government that lost their income from the import tax unhappy. This led to the government arresting more than 200 government, customs, and law enforcement officials in the southern Guangdong area around Zhanjiang on September 8, 1998. This affair was known as the "9898 smuggling case", the largest mainland smuggling racket of the last 50 years. The state's lost revenue was estimated around ¥30 billion from the illegal import of thousands of tonnes of crude oil, steel, cars, and other manufactured goods.

Ninth generation (S140; 1991) 

Launched in 1991, this model of Toyota Crown departed from the traditional styling of previous models, and introduced the new Royal Touring trim level. The new hardtop model carried the S140 chassis designation, while the refreshed Crown sedan and wagon still kept the S130 chassis from the previous generation Crown. Unlike its predecessors, this model was produced exclusively in right-hand drive and consequently was not exported to markets with right-hand traffic. Engine options used in the hardtop model were the 2JZ-GE 3000cc DOHC, 1JZ-GE 2500cc DOHC, and the 2L-THE diesel 2400cc SOHC engine. The 1G-FE 2000cc DOHC engine was carried over from the eighth generation for use in the sedan and wagon models. Transmission options were an optional five speed transmission dubbed "5ECT-i" used with the 2JZ-GE, a four speed "ECT-i" transmission used with the 2JZ-GE, and a four speed "ECT" transmission for the 1JZ-GE, 2L-THE, and 1G-FE equipped vehicles.

For the ninth-generation Crown, the Super Edition trim level was removed, and the Super Saloon trim became the entry-level trim. A new trim level was introduced, called Royal Touring, meant to be a mid-tier model with the option of both the 2JZ-GE and 1JZ-GE. The trim levels for the S140 hardtop are Super Select, Super Saloon Extra, Royal Touring, Royal Saloon, and Royal Saloon G. The Royal Saloon G trim kept all of the luxurious options of the previous generation including a fully digital gauge cluster, GPS navigation, and more safety equipment than other trim levels. As with the previous generation, the air suspension-equipped Royal Saloon G has a different model code (JZS145 versus JZS143 for the coil sprung model).

Styling was largely changed from the S130 generation. The design had shifted to a more curved front and rear end, and removed the Crown badges from the C-pillars which had been on previous models. A brand new taillight design was introduced, which was a curved, wrap-around design. The front end styling was influenced from the UCF10 Toyota Celsior which was released two years prior to the S140 Crown hardtop. Because of the new rear-end styling moving away from the traditional separate, squared taillights, the design was negatively received. This caused sales and popularity to be much lower than its rivals, the Nissan Cedric and Gloria, as well as the previous generation Crown.

In January 1993, a special-edition model was released, called the Prestige Saloon series for the Royal Saloon G and the Royal Saloon trims, and the Owners Prestige series for the Royal Touring trim. This special model included new chrome door handles and an all-chrome grill.

Later in 1993, a facelift model was released. The rear design went back to that of the S130 type Crown which was more favorably received. Other changes included restoring the Crown emblems to the C-pillars, a further revised front grill, front bumper, and rear bumper. This newly revised Crown was well received over the previous styling, and was able to win back some sales for the ninth-generation Crown.

Even after the facelift styling in late 1993, the ninth-generation Crown was labeled a failure in Japan compared to other generations and its rivals. Because of the lower sales volume, car recycling for tax incentive in Japan, and the export of used examples to other countries, the ninth-generation Crown has become difficult to find within Japan.

Tenth generation (S150; 1995) 

The 150-series Crown, launched in 1995, had boxier styling than the previous generation and was built as a sedan and hardtop (frameless door window) only. This was the first Crown to not be built using body-on-frame construction, adopting the unibody construction introduced with the 140-series Majesta. The wagon retained the old S130 chassis until 1999.

The hardtop was offered in Royal Extra, Royal Saloon, Royal Saloon G, and sporty Royal Touring trim levels, while sedans were offered in Super Deluxe, Super Saloon, Super Saloon Extra and Royal Saloon trims.

Gasoline engines were offered solely as inline 6-cylinder units with 2.0, 2.5, or 3.0-liter displacements, while an LPG version of the 2.0 L engine was offered, as was a 2.4 L 4-cylinder turbodiesel. As with previous generations, all vehicles with the 2.0 L engine were offered in a slightly shorter and narrower vehicle so as to be in compliance with Japanese government dimension regulations. All-wheel drive was offered for the Royal Extra and Royal Saloon. The S150 Crown would be the last generation to be offered with a manual transmission.

In 1996, it won the Automotive Researchers' and Journalists' Conference Car of the Year award in Japan which it shared with the Crown Majesta.

Unlike most preceding generations, the S150 Crown was not exported in great numbers. It was mainly sent to China, Hong Kong, the Middle East, and Southeast Asian markets like the Philippines, Singapore and Vietnam, with limited exports to some Caribbean and Latin American countries. These Crowns, with sedan rather than hardtop bodywork, were fitted either with the 2.0-liter 1G-FE or the 3-liter 2JZ-GE unit depending on market conditions.

Eleventh generation (S170; 1999) 

The 170-series, launched in September 1999, features shorter front overhang therefore maximizing interior and trunk space. There are two different 170-series 4-door Saloon; the Royal and Athlete. The Majesta, while sharing the same S170 chassis, is a separate vehicle which is larger and longer than the Crown and has distinctive front and rear styling. The four-door Hardtop was discontinued and no left-hand drive versions were produced, restricting exports to right-hand drive markets like Singapore. The 170-series Estate launched in December 1999 was the first new Crown Wagon after the 130-series and continued in production until March 2007. The engine installed is either the 2.0, 2.5 or 3.0 in-line-six. The Athlete V has 2.5-liter 1JZ-GTE turbo and was offered in both sedan and wagon versions, however the Athlete V wagon was only available until 2003, despite Crown Estate production continuing until 2007. The Royal Saloon was also offered with a 3.0-liter 2JZ-FSE mild hybrid from August 2001 to 2003, using a belted alternator starter system. Later non-hybrid models were offered with the direct-injection version of the 2JZ engine.

For the updated Athlete versions starting from August 2001, the tail lamps were changed from incandescent to LED lights and the front grille changed to a mesh design. Furthermore, the grey cloth interior was changed to black cloth, with black leather becoming an available option. Optional 17-inch wheels were also offered starting from 2001. An innovation was the electronically controlled (Toyota Electronic Modulated Suspension) air suspension combining nonlinear H-infinity control of damping force and roll-orientation control. The 170-series Crown replaced the aging 130-series in the Indonesian market.

A total of 10,545 Athlete V sedans were manufactured, with a further 5,012 Athlete V Estates manufactured.

Gallery

Twelfth generation (S180; 2003) 

The S180 model of the Crown, released in late 2003, was based on the Zero Crown concept car. The engine was changed to a V6 for the new Royal and Athlete models, while the Crown Majesta used the V8 only, now in 4.3-liter form with 4WD optional. The new engines gave more performance while also giving better fuel economy. Left-hand drive Crowns became available for the first time since 2001 with this generation, although they were produced exclusively in China by Tianjin FAW Toyota Motor for sale in the domestic market. Radar Pre-Collision System added a single digital camera to improve the accuracy of collision forecast and warning and control levels. In television commercials in Japan a song was written by composer John Harle titled "How should I my true love know?". G-BOOK was introduced in May 2006.

These changes gave it the largest interior size among its contemporaries, more than the Mercedes-Benz S-Class or BMW 7 Series. The slightly shorter and narrower versions with a 2.0 L engine are no longer offered as a Crown, with the Crown Comfort having assumed the market position in Japan for vehicles that complied with Japanese government dimension regulations.

The S170 series Crown Estate was continued alongside the S180 sedans, and was replaced by the luxury-oriented Toyota Alphard for load carrying duties and multiple passengers. It continued to use the older inline six-cylinder engines.

Gallery

Thirteenth generation (S200; 2008) 

This generation of the Crown is available in 4 different trim levels: the Crown Royal series which is a more comfortable and luxurious car; the Crown Athlete series which takes the luxurious aspect of the Royal series but has more aggressive styling and sporty features; the Crown Majesta series with different styling and more luxurious features than the Royal series; and the Crown Hybrid series which is a trim level designated for the Hybrid Synergy Drive V6 drivetrain. The larger 4.6 L 1UR-FSE V8 engine incurs a higher road tax liability.

Innovation 
 The Crown is one of the first vehicles to have a Navigation/Artificial Intelligence-Adaptive Variable Suspension System (NAVI/AI-AVS) 3 Dimensional Satellite Navigation System coupled with G-BOOK and boasts many features that have not been developed by other luxury car makers.  This system can adjust the damper firmness for corners based on map data and change transmission gear shift timings and engine braking for merging on and off highways and approaching tollbooths.
 First Toyota vehicle with active noise control.
 World first Collision avoidance system (PCS) with front-side millimeter wave radar to detect potential side collisions primarily at intersections or when another vehicle crosses the center line. The latest version tilts the rear seat upward, placing the passenger in a more ideal crash position if it detects a front or rear impact.
 World first PCS Collision avoidance system with GPS-navigation linked brake assist function. The system, which is designed to determine if the driver is late in decelerating at an approaching stop sign, will then sound an alert and can also pre-charge the brakes to provide optimum braking force if deemed necessary. This system works in certain Japanese cities and requires Japan specific road markings that are detected by a CCD camera.
 The Crown Hybrid Night View introduced the first pedestrian detection feature for an active Automotive night vision system. Toyota added a feature which highlights pedestrians and presents them in a box on an LCD display in front of the driver.
 Updated Driver Monitoring System for detecting whether the driver's eyes are properly open. It monitors the driver's eyes to detect the driver's level of wakefulness. This system is designed to work even if the driver is wearing sunglasses, and at night.
 World's first center airbag introduced in 2009.

The Crown is set to rival the European BMW 5 Series, Mercedes-Benz E-Class, Audi A6, Jaguar XF, the American Cadillac CTS, and the Japanese Acura RLX, Honda Legend, Infiniti M and Nissan Fuga. This is the longest and widest Crown to be built until the arrival of the fourteenth generation (S210 model).

The Crown Athlete has been tested to do 0–100 km/h in under 6 seconds, while the Crown Hybrid has been estimated to take 5.4 seconds due to the additional power of the hybrid motor. The mechanically similar Lexus GS 450H Hybrid (GWS191) outputs .

The Crown Hybrid Concept was exhibited at the 2007 Tokyo Motor Show.

Gallery

Fourteenth generation (S210; 2012) 

The fourteenth generation Crown was launched on 25 December 2012 with new styling, with the Royal series front styling theme paying homage to the fifth generation MS105 series. Most aspects of the car can be controlled by Toyota Multi-Operation Touch panel.

The S210 Crown was launched in China in March 2015. Pricing currently ranges between 250,800 and 332,800 yuan (US$36,830–48,860) with four trim levels known as: Pioneer, Fashion, Sports and Elite. The Crown currently uses the 2-liter 8AR-FTS turbocharged four-cylinder engine paired to an 8-speed automatic gearbox. Compared to its Japanese counterpart, the Crown S210 in China is 35 millimetres longer in length, 5 millimetres wider, 15 millimetres shorter in height, 65 millimetres longer in wheelbase and is 165 to 305 kilograms lighter in kerb weight. The front end of the Chinese variant has a razor blade grille just like its Japanese counterpart and has thinner headlights and tail lights for a sleeker design.

In Japan, the S210 series Crown was discontinued in June 2018, where it was replaced by the S220 model. It also ended production in May 2020 for the Chinese market, where the XX50 series Avalon replaced it.

Reborn Pink 
A special edition version of the S210 Crown was produced in association with Japanese presenter/producer Terry Ito. It featured a bright pink exterior and various pink interior details. It was offered to customers for the month of September 2013. Toyota stated that they received 650 orders for the car, of which were mostly from male customers. Prices for used examples remain high because of the uniqueness and rarity of the trim.

Gallery

Fifteenth generation (S220; 2018) 

The fifteenth-generation Crown was unveiled as a concept at the 45th Tokyo Motor Show in October 2017 and went on sale on 26 June 2018. The vehicle is built on a narrow version of the same TNGA-L platform that is used by other Lexus and luxury Toyota sedans. Three engine choices are offered so as to provide buyers advantages in savings with regards to Japan's annual road tax obligation, and standard equipment content is increased with each trim package matched to the engine size.

Trim levels for the Japanese market Crown are B, S, G, G Executive, RS-B, RS, and RS Advance. All trim levels are offered with either rear wheel drive or full-time all-wheel drive. The S220 Crown carried over the 2.0-liter 8SR-FTS turbocharged four-cylinder gasoline engine from the previous model, introduced the 2.5 liter A25A-FXS paired with the Hybrid Synergy Drive system, as well as the 3.5-liter 8GR-FXS V6 paired with the Multi Stage Hybrid system from the Lexus LC 500h and LS 500h. The 2.0 L engine is only available in the rear wheel drive RS and RS Advance. All trim levels, except the rear wheel drive G Executive, can be purchased with the 2.5 L Hybrid. The 3.5 L Hybrid is only installed in the rear wheel drive RS Advance and G Executive. The only engine for the 4WD models is 2.5 L Hybrid. The 2.5 L Hybrid G Executive is the only version exported to Indonesia.

In October 2019, the S220 Crown was selected by the government of Indonesia to serve as an official vehicle for cabinet ministers, replacing the older Crown Royal Saloon which had been in use since 2009. However, unlike some preceding generations of the Crown in Indonesia, the S220 is imported in small numbers and unavailable for consumer purchase.

In 2020, a facelift of the S220 Crown was planned but rejected by president Akio Toyoda and scrapped in favour of developing a new generation. However, in November 2020, the S220 received a minor update which brought a redesigned centre control stack and centre console to the interior, featuring a single 12.3-inch touchscreen and more intuitive physical climate controls in place of the previous dual-screen design.

T-Connect 
The fifteenth-generation Crown is one of the first Toyota models to be equipped with a DCM (Data Communication Module) system which then links with a Vehicle Control Network. By using this hardware, Toyota was able to provide various connected services to T-Connect subscribers through its proprietary Mobility Service Platform (MSPF), an information infrastructure developed by the company for Connected Cars. From then, Toyota intended to equip most new passenger vehicles in its domestic market with DCM.

On August 1, 2018, Toyota Motor Corporation (Toyota), with Toyota City, started Japan's first verification testing for road maintenance inspections using vehicle data obtained from connected cars. The verification test enabled assessment of whether the degree of road deterioration index values computed from the car's behavior data and actual road conditions are consistent, and validate these findings on more typical regional roads. Toyota also aimed to further advance its technology toward supporting administrative services that implement road maintenance and inspection work in Toyota City more accurately and appropriately.

Safety and driver assistance

Toyota Safety Sense 2.0 
The fifteenth generation Crown is equipped with Toyota Safety Sense 2.0 just like most Toyota models for 2018. Some added or improved features include:
 (LTA) Lane Tracing Assist
 Dynamic Radar Cruise Control (with all-speed vehicle following function)
 (PCS) Pre-Collision System with Pedestrian Detection (can detect bicyclists and even pedestrians at night)
 (AHB) Automatic High Beam
 (RSA) Road Sign Assist
 Advance car launch notification function

Gallery

Sixteenth generation 
The sixteenth generation of the Crown family was unveiled on 15 July 2022. Considered as a "reboot" to the Crown nameplate, four body styles were introduced, which are Crossover, Sport (previewed by the Crossover EV concept car in December 2021), Sedan and Estate. The latter three body styles will be released in 2023. Citing the Crown as a "symbol of Japan's affluence and Japanese pride", Toyota CEO Akio Toyoda announced that the Crown range of vehicles will be available in global markets for the first time in history, with availability in about 40 countries and regions with an expected annual sales volume of around 200,000 units.

The decision to develop the sixteenth-generation Crown arose from rejection of plans for a mid-regenerational refresh of the fifteenth-generation model, after Akio Toyoda scrapped the plans and advocated for a next-generation model at a product planning meeting.

Crossover (S235; 2022) 

The Crossover-type Crown was released on 15 July 2022 as the first body style of the sixteenth-generation Crown family to be launched. It will be sold in North America after 50 years of hiatus of the Crown nameplate in the region since 1972.

The design of the Crossover-type Crown was described as a combination between a full-size sedan and an SUV, with a sloping roof and a conventional sedan trunk opening. It is based on the front-wheel drive-based GA-K platform while offering "E-Four"/"E-Four Advanced" electric four-wheel drive system as standard. All models come equipped with acoustic glass and extensive sound deadening to improve noise, vibration, and harshness, emphasizing Crown's premium positioning.

Mass production of the Crown Crossover was started at the Tsutsumi plant from around late August 2022, and at the Motomachi plant from mid-September 2022.

Markets

Japan 
Targeted monthly sales in Japan is set at 3,200 units. It went on sale in September 2022.

North America 
The North American market Crown went on sale in October 2022 as a 2023 model year vehicle as a replacement to Toyota’s former full-size sedan, the Avalon. Offered only in the Crossover body style and marketed simply as "Crown", grade levels available in the US and Canada are XLE, Limited, and Platinum. The latter is equipped with the T24A-FTS engine and a standard Adaptive Variable Suspension. The North American market Crown will not wear the Crown emblem at the front and the steering wheel, and will instead wear Toyota's corporate emblem. It is also not equipped with the full-width daytime running light bar available in the Japanese market model, which is replaced with a chrome piece. The Crown replaced the Avalon as Toyota's flagship sedan in the North American market.

China 
In China, the model is sold as the Crown SportCross by FAW Toyota as an imported model. It was introduced at the December 2022 Guangzhou Auto Show.

Sport (2023) 

The Crown Sport was previewed as a mock-up model in July 2022 and is scheduled for 2023 release. Previously, the same model was showcased as a battery electric vehicle concept called the "Crossover EV" in December 2021.

Sedan (2023) 

The Crown Sedan is a four-door sedan that was previewed as a mock-up model in July 2022 and is scheduled for 2023 release. Compared to the fifteenth generation, the sixteenth-generation sedan will be  longer in length and  longer in wheelbase.

Markets

China 
In November 2022, FAW Toyota announced plans to sell the sixteenth-generation Crown Sedan in China as an imported model, marking the return of this model to the Chinese market after the domestically-produced fourteenth-generation Sedan was discontinued in 2020. It was showcased in a mock-up prototype form at the Guangzhou Auto Show in December 2022.

Estate (2023) 

The Crown Estate was previewed as a mock-up model in July 2022 and is scheduled for 2023 release.

Nameplate usage for other models

Crown Comfort and Crown Sedan (XS10; 1995–2018) 

To replace the commercial variant of the S130 Crown sedan, which was popular with taxicab operators, Toyota released a long-wheelbase version of the Comfort fleet sedan under the Crown Comfort nameplate. An upscale variant of the Crown Comfort with better appointments was sold exclusively in Japan as the Crown Sedan. While these models bore the Crown nameplate, they were based on the outgoing X80 series Mark II. The Crown Comfort was popular among taxicab operators in Japan, Hong Kong and Singapore, but is gradually falling out of favour as better-appointed vehicles become available at competitive cost.

The Crown Comfort was removed from Toyota's Japanese website on 25 May 2017, with production of existing orders ceasing in January 2018. It was replaced by the JPN Taxi which was launched at the 45th Tokyo Motor Show in October 2017.

"Crown" sub-brand for the Chinese market 
In April 2021, Toyota used the "Crown" nameplate as a sub-brand for high-end models sold by FAW Toyota in China, shortly after the S210 Crown sedan was discontinued in mid-2020. The first models introduced were the Crown Kluger SUV (rebadged Highlander) and Crown Vellfire minivan (renamed from Vellfire). Both models feature the Crown logo replacing the front Toyota logo, and in other places such as the hubcaps, instrument cluster and steering wheel (Crown Kluger only).

Trademark dispute 
In November 2015, Wuhan Municipal Sanitation Machinery Co., Ltd. sued Toyota and a Wuhan-based automobile dealer for trademark infringement in China based on the similarity of the Crown logo to Wuhan Municipal Sanitation Machinery's China Trademark Registration No. 217925. Toyota had requested cancellation of this trademark registration in December 2014, but its request was denied by the China Trademark Office (CTMO).

Sales

Notes

References

Citations

Bibliography

External links 

  (global)

Crown
Cars introduced in 1955
1960s cars
1970s cars
1980s cars
1990s cars
2000s cars
2010s cars
2020s cars
Executive cars
Full-size vehicles
Sedans
Coupés
Station wagons
Coupé utilities
Rear-wheel-drive vehicles
All-wheel-drive vehicles
Hybrid electric cars
Partial zero-emissions vehicles
Taxi vehicles
Police vehicles
Vehicles with CVT transmission